Edroy is a census-designated place (CDP) in San Patricio County, Texas, United States. The population was 331 at the 2010 census.

History
The CDP was named for Ed Cubage and Roy Miller, who platted the place.

Geography
Edroy is located at  (27.971630, -97.675530).

Demographics
As of the census of 2000, there were 420 people, 118 households, and 101 families residing in the CDP. The population density was 201.9 people per square mile (78.0/km2). There were 142 housing units at an average density of 68.3/sq mi (26.4/km2). The racial makeup of the CDP was 68.57% White, 0.24% Asian, 25.48% from other races, and 5.71% from two or more races. Hispanic or Latino of any race were 80.71% of the population.

There were 118 households, out of which 44.1% had children under the age of 18 living with them, 60.2% were married couples living together, 19.5% had a female householder with no husband present, and 13.6% were non-families. 11.9% of all households were made up of individuals, and 5.9% had someone living alone who was 65 years of age or older. The average household size was 3.56 and the average family size was 3.88.

In the CDP, the population was spread out, with 33.1% under the age of 18, 10.0% from 18 to 24, 27.4% from 25 to 44, 17.1% from 45 to 64, and 12.4% who were 65 years of age or older. The median age was 31 years. For every 100 females, there were 104.9 males. For every 100 females age 18 and over, there were 96.5 males.

The median income for a household in the CDP was $26,000, and the median income for a family was $28,000. Males had a median income of $26,705 versus $17,344 for females. The per capita income for the CDP was $9,787. About 15.6% of families and 13.6% of the population were below the poverty line, including 16.5% of those under age 18 and 19.5% of those age 65 or over.

Education
Edroy is served by the Odem-Edroy Independent School District.

References

External links
 Edroy TexasSeascapes.com

Census-designated places in San Patricio County, Texas
Census-designated places in Texas
Corpus Christi metropolitan area